Charles Lewis Hind (1862–1927) was a British journalist, writer, editor, art critic, and art historian.

Biography
He served as the deputy editor of The Art Journal (1887–92) and the Pall Mall Budget. In 1893, he co-founded The Studio: An Illustrated Magazine of Fine and Applied Art. Three years later, Hind became the editor of The Academy and, after it merged with Literature, he continued with the editorship of The Academy and Literature, retiring in 1903.  Hind then became a contributor to several magazines and newspapers including the Daily Chronicle, and wrote numerous articles on post-impressionism.

Eight colour photographic illustrations by Hind featured in Days with Velasquez (1906). His 1911 book The Post Impressionists was described by the Shirakaba group as "a most substantial book on the Post-Impressionists in English." After World War I, he compiled various anthologies and published several books on the art of landscape and continued with his art criticism. He interviewed Rockwell Kent on his Alaskan drawings in the June 1919 issue of International Studio.

Selected works 
The Education of an Artist, 1906
Days with Velasquez, 1906
Turner's Golden Visions, 1907
Days in Cornwall, 1907
The Diary of a Looker-on, 1908
The Drawings of Leonardo da Vinci, 1910
The Consolations of a Critic, 1911
The Post Impressionists, 1911
Art and I, 1921
Authors and I, 1921
More Authors and I, 1922
Landscape Painting, 1924
Naphtali : being influences and adventures while earning a living by writing, 1926

References

External links
 
 

1862 births
1927 deaths
British male journalists
British writers
British editors
British art critics
British art historians